Anguillita is a small, uninhabited rocky island off the western tip of, and part of the territory of Anguilla, located in the Caribbean. It's the dependency's southernmost point, located at coordinates 18°9' N, 63°11' W. Its average elevation is inverted compared to most, at -89 feet below sea level.

Characteristics
Unlike Scrub Island, a larger island off the Eastern Tip and which has two excellent beaches, Anguillita is rarely even seen, since the western tip is virtually inaccessible by foot. As such it is rarely visited by tourists, though it is accessible by sea kayak.

Anguillita offers opportunities for scuba divers, and good snorkelling conditions can be found off its rugged coast. Species such as barracudas, stingrays, and turtles can be seen in its waters. There are three ledged mini-walls at a depth of some 5–20 metres, and numerous small underwater caves.

See also
List of lighthouses in Anguilla

References

Uninhabited islands of Anguilla
Tourist attractions in Anguilla